Wygonowo  (Vyhonovo) is a village in the administrative district of Gmina Boćki, within Bielsk County, Podlaskie Voivodeship, in north-eastern Poland.

According to the 1921 census, the village was inhabited by 267 people, among whom 245 were Roman Catholic, 17 Orthodox, and 5 Mosaic. At the same time, 264 inhabitants declared Polish nationality, 3 Belarusian. There were 50 residential buildings in the village.

References

Wygonowo